Alessandro Rodrigo da Silva (born 28 August 1984) is a visually impaired Brazilian Paralympic athlete. He represented Brazil at the 2016 Summer Paralympics in Rio de Janeiro, Brazil and he won the gold medal in the men's discus throw F11 event. He also competed in the men's shot put F12 event where he finished in 10th place.

At the 2017 World Championships he won the gold medal in the men's discus throw F11 event. Two years later, at the 2019 World Championships held in Dubai, United Arab Emirates, he won the gold medal in the men's discus throw F11 event and the bronze medal in the men's shot put F11 event.

References

External links 
 

1984 births
Living people
People from Santo André, São Paulo
Paralympic athletes of Brazil
Brazilian male discus throwers
Brazilian male shot putters
Paralympic gold medalists for Brazil
Paralympic silver medalists for Brazil
Paralympic athletes with a vision impairment
Paralympic medalists in athletics (track and field)
Athletes (track and field) at the 2016 Summer Paralympics
Athletes (track and field) at the 2020 Summer Paralympics
Medalists at the 2016 Summer Paralympics
Medalists at the 2020 Summer Paralympics
World Para Athletics Championships winners
Medalists at the 2015 Parapan American Games
Medalists at the 2019 Parapan American Games
Medalists at the World Para Athletics Championships
Sportspeople from São Paulo (state)
21st-century Brazilian people
Brazilian blind people